Bolma henica, common name the deep sea star shell, is a species of sea snail, a marine gastropod mollusk in the family Turbinidae, the turban snails.

Description
The size of the shell varies between 20 mm and 37 mm. The shell conical has a conical shape and is elevated with 7-8 whorls. Its color pattern is light yellowish ruddy, paler below. The apex is round. The first whorl is flattened. The upper three whorls are radiately ribbed, the following radiately slightly plicate in the direction of lines of growth, with a spiral series of rather large white separate beads upon the edge of the flattened shoulder below the suture, and six series of distinct small beads, separated by interstices of half their breadth upon the slope of the whorl. The periphery is sharply bicarinate, with the upper carina stellate with sharp compressed hollow spines, about twelve in number on body whorl. The lower carina contains thirty to thirty-five vaulted scales, becoming spines toward the aperture.  Between the carinae there are four rows of beads. The base of the shell is flat, with about ten concentric rows of very regular beads. The aperture is oblique, white within. The white columella is bluntly toothed below. The white umbilical tract is polished and slightly ridged. The operculum is oval, within flat, brown. Its outside is thick, white, granulose with a slight flange on the outer margin.

Distribution
This marine species occurs in the Indo-West Pacific and off Japan, the Philippines and Australia (New South Wales, Queensland).

References

 Watson, R.B. 1879. Mollusca of the 'Challenger' Expedition. Part IV. Trochidae (continued), viz. the Genera Basilisso and Trochus, and the Turbinidae, viz. the Genus Turbo. Journal of the Linnean Society of London, Zoology 14: 692-716
 Schepman, M.M. 1908. Prosobranchia (excluding Heteropoda and parasitic Prosobranchia). Rhipidoglossa and Docoglossa. With an appendix by Prof. R. Bergh [Pectinobranchiata]. Siboga-Expéditie Report 49(1): 1–108, 9 pls
 Kira, T. 1955. Coloured Illustrations of the Shells of Japan. Osaka, Japan : Hoikusha 204 pp.
 Beu, A.G. & Ponder, W.F. 1979. A revision of the species of Bolma Risso, 1826 (Gastropoda: Turbinidae). Records of the Australian Museum 32: 1-68 
 Wilson, B. 1993. Australian Marine Shells. Prosobranch Gastropods. Kallaroo, Western Australia : Odyssey Publishing Vol. 1 408 pp.

External links
 To Encyclopedia of Life
 To World Register of Marine Species
 

henica
Gastropods described in 1885